Norman Bruce Johnson (November 27, 1932 – March 22, 2016) was a Canadian ice hockey centre. He played for the Boston Bruins and Chicago Black Hawks between 1957 and 1960. The rest of his career, which lasted from 1953 to 1971, was mainly spent in the Western Hockey League.

Career statistics

Regular season and playoffs

References

External links
 

1932 births
2016 deaths
Boston Bruins players
Brandon Regals players
Brandon Wheat Kings coaches
Buffalo Bisons (AHL) players
Canadian ice hockey centres
Canadian ice hockey coaches
Chicago Blackhawks players
Fort Wayne Komets players
Ice hockey people from Saskatchewan
Los Angeles Blades (WHL) players
Moose Jaw Canucks players
Portland Buckaroos players
Rochester Americans players
Sportspeople from Moose Jaw
Springfield Indians players
St. Paul Rangers players
Western International Hockey League players